Moore High School is a four-year comprehensive high school located in Moore, Oklahoma, a suburb south of Oklahoma City. The school is led by one head principal and five class principals. Moore High School opened in 1920 and serves grades 9-12. The school is the only high school that serves the east side of Moore.

Academically, Moore offers a program in which 11th or 12th-grade students may apply to take morning or afternoon courses as offered at Moore Norman Technology Center. Twenty-seven Advanced Placement courses are offered by MHS in several topics including AP Music Theory, AP Studio Art, and AP Psychology.

2013 Tornado

The path of the 2013 Moore tornado barely missed the school, and students were kept inside the school gym, as well as other areas of the school, as the tornado approached around 15 minutes before school was dismissed.

Demographics

Male - 49%
Female - 51%
Native American/Alaskan - 5%
Asian/Pacific islanders - 2%
Black - 8%
Hispanic - 14%
White - 49%
Multiracial - 22%

41% of students are from low income families.

Notable alumni
Tom Cole (class of 1967): current U.S. Congressman from Oklahoma; former Oklahoma Secretary of State and state senator
Mike Hinckley (class of 2001): relief pitcher selected in the third round of the 2001 Major League Baseball Draft and debuted in Major League Baseball with the Washington Nationals in 2008
Corey Ivy (class of 1995): American football cornerback who played for the University of Oklahoma and in the NFL and UFL from 2001 to 2010
Jesse Jane (born Cindy Taylor) (class of 1998): pornographic actress who starred in the music video for "Step Up" by Drowning Pool 
Toby Keith (class of 1979): country singer
Randy Wayne (class of 1999): TV and film actor
Jay Villemarette: owner, founder, and president of Skulls Unlimited International and Skeletons: Museum of Osteology

References

External links
Official website

Public high schools in Oklahoma
Schools in Cleveland County, Oklahoma
Educational institutions established in 1968
1968 establishments in Oklahoma